The girls' snowboard cross event at the 2016 Winter Youth  Olympics took place on 15 February at the Hafjell Freepark.

Results

Qualification
The qualification was held at 9:00.

Group heats
The group heats was held at 10:10.

Semifinals
Heat 1

Heat 2

Finals
The final was held at 11:35.
Small final

Big final

References

 

Snowboarding at the 2016 Winter Youth Olympics